Kywin "Guywin" Supernaw (born June 2, 1975) is a former American football defensive back who played three seasons with the Detroit Lions of the National Football League. He first enrolled at Northeastern Oklahoma A&M College before transferring to Indiana University Bloomington. He attended Skiatook High School in Skiatook, Oklahoma.

References

External links
Just Sports Stats
College stats

Living people
1975 births
Players of American football from Oklahoma
American football defensive backs
Northeastern Oklahoma A&M Golden Norsemen football players
Indiana Hoosiers football players
Detroit Lions players
People from Claremore, Oklahoma